Martin David Anson Duncan (born 12 July 1948) is an English director, actor, composer, and choreographer. Duncan was artistic director of the Nottingham Playhouse from 1994 to 1999 and joint artistic director of the Chichester Festival Theatre from 2003 to 2005 with Ruth Mackenzie and Steven Pimlott. He has composed the musical scores for over 50 theatre productions.

After training at the London Academy of Music and Dramatic Art, Duncan began his career in repertory theatre in 1968. He continued to act on stage and screen until the late 1980s, becoming a director of theatre and opera. His many opera productions include performances at the Royal Opera House, Covent Garden, Scottish Opera, English National Opera, Glyndebourne Festival, Bayerische Staatsoper in Munich and the Berlin Staatsoper.

Early life and education
Duncan was born in Chelsea, London on 12 July 1948. He is the son of Margaret Elizabeth Duncan (née Thurlow) and Ronald Francis Hamilton Anson Duncan , a Royal Naval captain and senior operations executive. Through his father, Duncan is a descendant of the British general Sir George Anson. He attended Durston House, a preparatory school in Ealing, and Westminster School from 1961 to 1966. While there, he was head of Wren's, one of the constituent school houses.

Theatre

Acting
Duncan's stage credits have included plays by William Shakespeare (as Rosencrantz in Hamlet, Gonzalo in The Tempest, Gower in Pericles, Time in The Winter's Tale, Friar Laurence in Romeo and Juliet, and Banquo in Macbeth), George Bernard Shaw (in Village Wooing and as Frank in Mrs. Warren's Profession), and Noël Coward (in Tonight at 8.30 and as Garry Essendine in Present Laughter). He has played Trepan in The Master and Margarita, Governor Bellingham in The Scarlet Letter (Chichester Festival Theatre), and has performed in many musicals, including The Boy Friend as Alphonse, Privates on Parade as Charlie, Happy End as The Professor, Kiss Me Kate as Hortensio, Sweet Charity as Vittorio Vidal, Anything Goes as Sir Evelyn Oakleigh, and Company as Harry.

In 1987, Duncan became an associate artist of the Crucible Theatre, Sheffield, where his many roles included appearances in The History of Tom Jones, as Canon Chasuble in The Importance of Being Ernest, Antonio Salieri in Amadeus, Courtling in the British première of The Park by Botho Strauss, and Simeonov Pischik in The Cherry Orchard. For a year, he appeared in the acclaimed West End musical Happy as a Sandbag at the Ambassadors Theatre, later filmed for BBC Television. In 1984, he appeared as Brad Majors in the Italian Tour of The Rocky Horror Show.

Writing, directing, and designing
In 1976, Duncan formed The Fireflies of the Boulevard, a theatre company, with director Ultz. Among their dozens of plays performed across the UK, he has written and directed The Revels of Gargantua in Exile Part II (1974), Kino Tata (1976), Milady's Silver Musick (1977), The Amusing Spectacle of Cinderella and Her Naughty-Naughty Sisters (1977), Stringgames (1979), A Cow. A Mooon. A Full Stop (1997), and Two Or Three Women Walking (2005). In collaboration with Ultz, Duncan wrote A Night In Old Peking (1978), The Servant of Two Masters (1978), Merrie Pranckés (1980), and All In All, Lenore! (1982).

As director and co-writer of the National Theatre of Brent, Duncan collaborated on The Greatest Story Ever Told (1987) (BBC Radio) the Kiln and Edinburgh Fringe, The French Revolution (1989) on BBC Television), All the World's a Globe (1990) which won a Sony Award for Best Comedy, The Mysteries of Sex (Nottingham Playhouse), Love Upon The Throne (1998) Edinburgh Fringe)and later the Bush, Berlin Festival and Comedy theatreswhich was nominated for an Olivier Award for Best Comedy, Massive Landmarks of the 20th Century (1999) on Channel 4, The Wonder of Sex (2001) at the National Theatre, and The Mona Lisa which received a Sony Award for Best Comedy.

From 1994 to 1999, Duncan was Artistic Director of the Nottingham Playhouse. His productions there included The Nose, The Adventures of Pinnochio, Kurt Weill and Bertolt Brecht's Happy End, A Fool and His Money (Scottish Opera and Birmingham Repertory Theatre), The Cabinet of Doktor Caligari (Lyric Theatre), Time and the Room (Edinburgh International Festival, Krapp's Last Tape with John Neville, and Endgame (Weimar Festival). In 1996, the Nottingham Playhouse was awarded the prestigious Prudential Award.

From 2002 to 2005, Martin was Co-Artistic Director of the Chichester Festival Theatre. His productions there included The Gondoliers, Cole Porter’s Out of This World, How to Succeed in Business Without Really Trying (which won a UK Theatre Award for Best Musical), The Government Inspector, I Caught My Death In Venice with the Brothers Marquez, Botho Strauss' Seven Doors, and Doctor Faustus (Minerva Theatre).

As well as directing all of his own shows, Duncan has also directed Moses – The 10 Commandments (Theater St. Gallen), Man of La Mancha (Royal Lyceum Theatre), The Comedy of Errors (Maxim Gorki Theater), Jean Genet's The Blacks (Market Theatre of Johannesburg and Stockholm City Theatre), The Sunshine Boys (Deutsches Theater Berlin), The Rocky Horror Show (Deutsches Theater), 4 MARYs with Second Stride, The Small Moments (In Life) with Judith Weir (Royal Festival Hall), two World premières (Broken Biscuits and Puppy Dogs Tales) by Dave Pumford, two Crucible Theatre productions (Eugène Ionesco's The Bald Prima Donna and Guillaume Apollinaire's The Breasts of Tiresias), Andy Warhol's Pork (Eventhaus), School for Clowns (Lilian Baylis Theatre) with co-director Stephen Daldry, and Alexander Pushkin’s Mozart and Salieri (Crucible Theatre).  Duncan was Associate Director on both Steven Pimlott's production of Twelfth Night at the Sheffield Crucible and the Pet Shop Boys' 1991 World Tour. With Clare Venables, he co-directed the musical Gypsy (Sheffield Crucible).

Duncan created the Chromolume Sequence for Stephen Sondheim's Sunday in the Park with George (1991, National Theatre). He directed Sondheim at 80 at the Royal Albert Hall for the BBC Proms in 2010, celebrating the 80th Birthday of Broadway composer Stephen Sondheim. The show starred Simon Russell Beale, Daniel Evans, Julian Ovenden, and Judi Dench who sang Sondheim's "Send In the Clowns", a piece originally written for actress Glynis Johns.

Composing
In musical theatre, Duncan has written scores for over 50 productions. These include plays by John Arden (The Hero Rises Up and Armstrong's Last Goodnight), Bertolt Brecht's Drums in the Night, An Italian Straw Hat (1970), The Glass Menagerie (1973), She Stoops to Conquer, Edward Bond's Bingo starring Sir John Gielgud (Royal Court Theatre), R. D. Laing's Knots (London/ Brooklyn Academy of Music), Cowardice (1982) starring Sir Ian McKellen and Janet Suzman (Ambassadors Theatre), A Mad World, My Masters and The Taming of the Shrew (Theatre Royal Stratford East), Pericles (Stockholm City Theatre), plays at the Crucible Theatre (including Tom Jones, Uncle Vanya, The Winter's Tale, The Breasts of Tiresias, and The Park), The Lady from the Sea (Citizens Theatre), and School for Clowns at the Lilian Baylis Theatre (1988).

Choreographing
Premiering on 12 October 1988, Duncan choreographed Stephen Lowe's Divine Gossip at the Royal Shakespeare Company's Pit Theatre. With the same company, he choreographed Eugène Ionesco's Macbett.

In 1986, Duncan staged the Masques for Nicholas Hytner's productions of Edward II (Manchester Royal Exchange) and The Tempest (Royal Shakespeare Company). At the Royal Exchange, he also staged the Masques for Ian McDiarmid's production of Don Juan.

Opera

Writing and directing
Duncan has written the libretti for and directed two short operas: Three Really Good Tea Parties with composer Jonathan Dove at the Salisbury International Arts Festival and Warning Bells with writer Jeremy Sams in 1989, Dartington.

For Opera North, Duncan has directed several operas. These include L'heure espagnole (1989), Gianni Schicchi (1990), The Thieving Magpie (1992) Orpheus in the Underworld (1992), The Adventures of Pinocchio (2007), and A Midsummer Night's Dream (2008), and Yolanta (Edinburgh International Festival). For Munich's Bavarian State Opera, he directed the Opernwelt award-winning Xerxes (1996), La clemenza di Tito (1999), The Rake's Progress (2002), and Die Entführung aus dem Serail (2003).

Other productions include Albert Herring (1991, Canadian Opera Company), The Magic Flute (1993, Scottish Opera/ Royal Opera House), H.M.S. Pinafore, Die Fledermaus (1994, D'Oyly Carte Opera Company), Ariadne auf Naxos (1997, Scottish Opera/ 2007, Garsington Opera/ 2010, Norwegian Opera Company), The Last Supper (2000, Berlin State Opera/ 2001, Glyndebourne Opera), The Love for Three Oranges (2001, Cologne Opera), Pagliacci and Cavalleria rusticana (2002, Royal Albert Hall), La traviata (2003, Flanders Opera), The Gondoliers (2006, English National Opera), The Original Chinese Conjuror (2006, Aldeburgh Festival), The Adventures of Pinocchio (2008, Chemnitz Opera/ 2009, Minnesota Opera/ 2011, Moscow), Mirandolina (2009, Garsington Opera), Artaxerxes (2009, Royal Opera House), Armida (2010, Garsington Opera), La forza del destino (2010, Opera Holland Park), Betrothal in a Monastery (2011, Théâtre du Capitole de Toulouse/ 2011, Opéra-Comique), Il turco in Italia (2011, Garsington Opera), Noye's Fludde (2013, Aldeburgh Festival), Vert-Vert (2014, Garsington Opera), Alice’s Adventures in Wonderland (2013–17, Opera Holland Park), The Corridor and The Cure (2015, Aldeburgh Festival/ 2016, Holland Festival), and Fantasio (2019, Garsington Opera).

In 1992, Duncan was co-writer of the scenario for Matthew Bourne's The Nutcracker for Opera North and the Edinburgh International Festival, which he co-directed with Bourne. It received an Olivier Award nomination.

At the BBC Proms 2012, Duncan directed Gilbert and Sullivan's The Yeomen of the Guard.

Choreographing
Duncan was choreographer for the Cassandro Theatre Sequence in Tim Albery's 1991 production of Benvenuto Cellini at the Netherlands Opera.

Film and television
Duncan's film credits include appearances in The Children of Icarus (a German television film), Flying into the Wind (a 1983 television film) as the prosecuting counsel, Forever Young (a 1983 film) as John, Caprice (a 1986 film short directed by Joanna Hogg) as the film director, and the award winning Flying Into the Wind (a television film by David Leland).

On television, Duncan has appeared in multiple episodes on such shows as The Legend of Robin Hood as Blondin and When the Boat Comes In as Roddy. With single episode appearances, he has appeared in Omnibus (in the 1990 episode Van Gogh) as the Impressionist Man and The Two Ronnies (in 1977 on BBC1).

Other work
Duncan has written lyrics for four Chrysalis Records albums by musician Brian Protheroe: "Pinball" in 1974, "Pick-Up" in 1975, and "I/You" in 1976. He met Protheroe in 1968 at the Theatre Royal Lincoln and the two became a musical collaboration. In 2005, he wrote an additional album for Protheroe: "Citysong" with Basta label.

Between 2009 and 2012, Duncan was an artistic adviser to Ruth Mackenzie, Director of the 2012 Cultural Olympiad.

Credits

Theatre

Opera

Film

Radio

Music

Acting credits

Theatre

Film

Television

Vocalist credits

External links
 
 Martin Duncan at Operabase
 Martin Duncan at Doollee.com

Notes

References

Living people
1948 births
People from Chelsea, London
People educated at Westminster School, London
Alumni of the London Academy of Music and Dramatic Art
British opera directors
Opera managers
20th-century English male actors
Male actors from London
Media founders
20th-century British artists
21st-century British artists
20th-century English composers
21st-century English composers
20th-century English screenwriters
21st-century British screenwriters
English musical theatre directors
20th-century English male singers
English theatre managers and producers
Musical theatre producers
Male musical theatre composers
English choreographers
Ballad musicians
Singers from London
Stage managers